Nino Galović (born 6 July 1992) is a Croatian professional footballer who plays for F.C. Arouca in Portugal as a defender.

Club career
On 10 September 2011, Galović made his professional debut playing against NK Varaždin where he started the match and played the whole 90 minutes.
During his first senior year, he played only 9 games in total. During his second senior year, he became a starter and played every minute without a yellow card until winter break. After winter break he only played several more games under a new coach.

In the third season, he didn't start because of a minor injury. Later, through the season he managed to play 19 games. He became captain of RNK Split and led his team to the playoff phase of UEFA Europa League where they lost to Torino. Throughout the season he recorded 48 matches(33 leagues, 7 cups, 8 Europe), the most minutes in his team and the most minutes in the whole league.

On 7 July 2016 signed with F.C. Ashdod from Israeli Premier League.
In Israel, Galovic played just 6 league matches and 4 Toto cup matches. After 7 months in FC Ashdod, he broke the contract.

On 9 January 2017, Nino signed with FC Dinamo Minsk.
Galovic became club captain in his second year in Dinamo Minsk. He played a major role in Dinamo Minsk playing 84 games and scoring 11 times.

On 1 January 2019, he signed for the Japanese club Sagan Tosu, where he was a teammate with Fernando Torres. There he played only several games and after 8 months he returned to Dinamo Minsk on a half-season loan option.

After breaking the contract with Sagan Tosu, Nino signed with NK Rijeka on 28 January 2020.
In Rijeka, Nino spent 2 years, where played over 65 games and scored 7 goals. During 2 year spell, he won the cup with NK Rijeka and participated in UEFA Europa League.
During that time he also captained the team on a few occasions.

In January 2022, he signed with the Portuguese team FC Arouca.

References

External links

Dinamo Minsk signs Galovic
SportNet - Galovic stats

1992 births
Living people
People from Supetar
Association football central defenders
Croatian footballers
Croatia youth international footballers
Croatia under-21 international footballers
RNK Split players
NK Slaven Belupo players
F.C. Ashdod players
FC Dinamo Minsk players
Sagan Tosu players
HNK Rijeka players
F.C. Arouca players
Croatian Football League players
Israeli Premier League players
Belarusian Premier League players
J1 League players
Primeira Liga players
Croatian expatriate footballers
Expatriate footballers in Israel
Croatian expatriate sportspeople in Israel
Expatriate footballers in Belarus
Croatian expatriate sportspeople in Belarus
Expatriate footballers in Japan
Croatian expatriate sportspeople in Japan
Expatriate footballers in Portugal
Croatian expatriate sportspeople in Portugal